Sándor Békési (27 August 1928 – 9 March 1994) was a Hungarian gymnast. He competed in eight events at the 1960 Summer Olympics.

References

1928 births
1994 deaths
Hungarian male artistic gymnasts
Olympic gymnasts of Hungary
Gymnasts at the 1960 Summer Olympics
Sportspeople from Debrecen
20th-century Hungarian people